El Capitan Granite is a type of granite (also see granodiorite), in a large area near El Capitan, in Yosemite National Park, California, United States. The granite forms part of the Tuolumne Intrusive Suite (also known as Tuolumne Batholith), one of the four major intrusive suites within the Sierra Nevada.

El Capitan granite is mostly unjointed.

Composition

The granite has abundant quartz, plagioclase, crystals of orthoclase, and both feldspars — orthoclase and plagioclase  — are white. Hornblende is rare, compared to other Yosemite granites. Most black minerals are biotite.

Location

It is found west of Half Dome Granodiorite, both north and south, to a western limit near Cookie Cliffs.

All of Turtleback Dome, El Capitan, The Three Brothers, and Cathedral Rocks are made of El Capitan Granite as is Elephant Rock.

El Capitan Granite makes up most of the granite found in the west half of the Yosemite Valley area.

Age

El Capitan Granite intruded older plutonic rocks about 103 Ma, during the Cretaceous Period.

See also

 Cathedral Peak Granodiorite
 Geology of the Yosemite area
 Half Dome Granodiorite
 Kuna Crest Granodiorite
 Sentinel granodiorite
 Tuolumne Intrusive Suite

References

External links
 A technical link
 Another technical link

Geology of California
Geology of Yosemite National Park
Cretaceous magmatism
Yosemite National Park